Madeleine Gekiere (May 15, 1919 - July 2, 2014), was an American multi-disciplinary artist, illustrator, filmmaker and author. She is known for her drawings and mixed media paintings, as well as her short films, short stories and illustrated books. She illustrated Ray Bradbury’s 1995 novel Switch on the Night. Four books illustrated by Gekiere were chosen New York Times Best Illustrated Children’s Books of the Year from 1952 to 2002.

Life and education 
Madeleine Gekiere was born in Zurich in 1919 and graduated from school in 1938. Fearing that Switzerland might be invaded by Nazis, her Jewish family came to America when Madeleine was 20 years old. She studied at New York University, the Art Students League, and Brooklyn Museum School. Gekiere taught painting at City College in New York for more than 23 years. Madeleine was married to an actor Paul Potter. 

She committed suicide in her Chelsea apartment at the age of 96.

Art 
Having completed her studies at New York University, the Art Students League, and Brooklyn Museum School, Gekiere found her way as an artist, painter and sculptor. Her early drawing and paintings explore modernist abstraction and feature an earthy palette of blacks, browns and tans, while her later works experiment with assemblage, using everyday objects implying connections to figurative forms, like light bulbs, wood handles, toys, hosiery and books. Gekiere began showing her work at the Badcock Gallery in the New York in 1950s.

At the same time she got acquainted with famed children’s book author and illustrator Helen Sewell living in same house who got Madeleine into book illustration. In the next ten years Gekiere illustrated two books that she wrote (Who Gave Us… Peacocks? Planes? & Ferris Wheels?, 1953 and The Frilly Lily and the Princess, 1960 and many books by other authors. She illustrated several books for the poet John Ciardi and Ray Bradbury’s 1955 novel Switch on the Night.

During 1970s and 1980s Gekiere made experimental short films, and recently, the Anthology Film Archives screened her collection including the 1980 film Chewing. Three of her films are available for rent at The Film-Maker’s Coop.

Exhibitions and collections 
Madeleine Gekiere exhibited with Fred Torres Collaborations. At her solo exhibition A Life Time of Sketchbooks (2012) twenty sketchbooks compiled by the artist were presented.

Gekiere’s art is in permanent collections of the Museum of New Zealand Te Papa Tongarewa, Baltimore Museum of Art, the Brooklyn Museum, the Dallas Museum of Art, and the New York Public Library.

Works

Books illustrated (selection) 
 Mrs. McThing, a play, Mary Chase, 1952
 Gwendolyn, Ruth H Helm, 1952
 Mr. Putterbee’s jungle, Ruth H Helm, 1953
 Who gave us … peacocks? planes? & ferris wheels? Madeleine Gekiere, 1953
 Grimm’s tales, Jacob Grimm, 1954
 Peterli and the mountain, Georgia Engelhard, 1954
 Switch on the night, Ray Bradbury, 1955
 The fisherman and his wife, Jacob Grimm, 1957
 The reason for the pelican, John Ciardi, 1959
 The frilly lily and the princess, Madeleine Gekiere, 1960
 John J. Plenty and Fiddler Dan: a new fable of the grasshopper and the ant, John Ciardi, 1963

Filmography (selection) 
 Three accelerations, 1970-1979
 Horizontal transfer, 1975
 The Breakable spaces between, 1980
 Arabesque for Marie Menken, 1982
 The Garden of Hieronymus, 1982
 They are not Chrysanthemums: Only Man Can Make a Rivet, 1984

References

External links 
 Madeleine Gekiere, Swiss Archive

1919 births
2014 deaths
20th-century American artists
21st-century American artists
20th-century American women artists
21st-century American women artists
New York University alumni
Artists from New York City
American women painters
Swiss emigrants to the United States